EveryBit.js is an open source user management and messaging platform written in JavaScript. The messaging system supports multiple file types and provides the ability to send content with 256 bit AES encryption.  

The system utilizes  ECDSA signed static content units called puffs. Puffs are JavaScript objects composed of a single content type. Each puff has a unique signature which can be used to verify the authenticity of its author and the integrity of its contents. Puffs can either be public and accessible for use by any application built on the EveryBit.js platform, or private and encrypted. Private keys are used to encrypt data for private puffs. I.CX, the encrypted messaging and file sharing web application is built on the EveryBit.js platform.

References

JavaScript programming tools